This is a list of all the sedimentary formations that are found in Germany.

See also
Geology of Germany

Lithostratigraphy of Germany
sedimentary formations